Geneva is a city in Franklin County, Iowa, United States. The population was 136 at the time of the 2020 census.

History
Geneva was platted in 1871, and it was incorporated as a town in 1903.

Geography
Geneva is located at  (42.675905, -93.131396).

Demographics

2010 census
As of the census of 2010, there were 165 people, 68 households, and 42 families residing in the city. The racial makeup of the city was 98.2% White and 1.8% from two or more races. Hispanic or Latino of any race were 0.6% of the population.

There were 68 households, of which 30.9% had children under the age of 18 living with them, 51.5% were married couples living together, 7.4% had a female householder with no husband present, 2.9% had a male householder with no wife present, and 38.2% were non-families. 32.4% of all households were made up of individuals, and 16.1% had someone living alone who was 65 years of age or older. The average household size was 2.43 and the average family size was 3.12.

The median age in the city was 40.2 years. 24.2% of residents were under the age of 18; 8.6% were between the ages of 18 and 24; 21.8% were from 25 to 44; 27.9% were from 45 to 64; and 17.6% were 65 years of age or older. The gender makeup of the city was 46.7% male and 53.3% female.

2000 census
As of the census of 2000, there were 171 people, 69 households, and 42 families residing in the city. The racial makeup of the city was 100.00% White. Hispanic or Latino of any race were 0.58% of the population.

There were 69 households, out of which 29.0% had children under the age of 18 living with them, 55.1% were married couples living together, 4.3% had a female householder with no husband present, and 37.7% were non-families. 34.8% of all households were made up of individuals, and 23.2% had someone living alone who was 65 years of age or older. The average household size was 2.48 and the average family size was 3.28.

The population was 29.8% under the age of 18, 5.8% from 18 to 24, 22.2% from 25 to 44, 24.0% from 45 to 64, and 18.1% who were 65 years of age or older. The median age was 40 years. For every 100 females, there were 78.1 males. For every 100 females age 18 and over, there were 81.8 males.

The median income for a household in the city was $33,542, and the median income for a family was $40,625. Males had a median income of $33,750 versus $20,000 for females. The per capita income for the city was $15,112. None of the families and 5.9% of the population were living below the poverty line, including no under eighteens and 8.5% of those over 64.

Education
AGWSR Community School District operates area public schools. The district formed on July 1, 2001, with the merger of the Wellsburg-Steamboat Rock Community School District and the Ackley–Geneva Community School District.

References

Cities in Iowa
Cities in Franklin County, Iowa
Populated places established in 1871
1871 establishments in Iowa